Kopec, Kopeć, or Köpec may refer to:

Places

Kopeć, a village in Ostrzeszów county, Poland
Köpec, a village in Baraolt, Romania
Köpeç, Uğurludağ

People

 Ben Kopec (born 1981), American musician
 Danny Kopec (1954–2016), American chess master, author, and computer scientist
 Dominik Kopeć, Polish athlete
 Matt Kopec, American politician
 Stefan Kopec (1888–1941), Polish biologist
 Tadeusz Kopeć (born 1960), Polish politician

See also
 
 KEPCO E&C, a South Korean company formerly known as "KOPEC"
 Kopek (disambiguation)